SH 881 may refer to:
Cyproterone, a steroidal antiandrogen
State highway 881, state highways numbered 881